The 2013–14 Senior Women's Challenger Trophy was the fifth edition of India's 50 over Women's Challenger Trophy. Three teams made up of the best players in India competed in a round-robin group, with the top two advancing to the final. All matches were held at the JSCA International Stadium Complex, Ranchi across four days in January 2014. The tournament was won by India Blue, who beat India Red in the final by 8 wickets.

Competition format
The three teams played in a round-robin group, playing each other team once, with the top two advancing to the final. Matches were played using a 50 over format.

The group worked on a points system with positions with the group being based on the total points. Points were awarded as follows:

Win: 4 points. 
Tie: 2 points. 
Loss: 0 points.
No Result/Abandoned: 2 points.

If points in the final table are equal, teams are separated by their Net Run Rate.

Squads

Standings

Source: CricketArchive

Group stage

Final

Statistics

Most runs

Source: CricketArchive

Most wickets

Source: CricketArchive

Notes

References

2013–14 Indian women's cricket
2013-14
Domestic cricket competitions in 2013–14
Senior Women's Challenger Trophy